Robert Arnold Anderson (22 January 1936 – 24 October 1996) was a New Zealand politician. He was a National Party MP from 1987 to 1996.

Biography
Anderson was born in Epsom, England, on 22 January 1936, and educated in England and Southern Rhodesia. He was a local board chairman from 1983 to 1987 and a member of the Local Government Commission.

He was first elected to Parliament in the 1987 election as MP for Kaimai, replacing the deceased Bruce Townshend. He beat former National Party President Sue Wood for selection in the seat. In 1990 he was appointed as Deputy Chairman of Committees during the fist term of the Fourth National Government.

He left Parliament at the 1996 election. He had been selected as National candidate for the new seat of Coromandel which replaced Kaimai, but withdrew due to illness (cancer). He was replaced by Murray McLean, who won the seat in 1996, but lost in the 1999 election.

Anderson was awarded the New Zealand 1990 Commemoration Medal. He died at Mount Maunganui on 24 October 1996.

Citations

References

 1990 Parliamentary Candidates for the New Zealand National Party by John Stringer (New Zealand National Party, 1990)

1936 births
1996 deaths
Deaths from cancer in New Zealand
New Zealand National Party MPs
Members of the New Zealand House of Representatives
New Zealand MPs for North Island electorates
20th-century New Zealand politicians
People from Epsom